Southampton, Itchen is a constituency represented in the House of Commons of the UK Parliament since 2015 by Royston Smith, a Conservative member of parliament.  Discounting the Speaker (of the House of Commons) returned in the early 1970s in two elections, local voters have elected the MP from only two parties alternately for various periods, with one party reaffiliation (defection) between elections when the Labour Party split in the 1980s.

Since 1987, campaigns in the seat have resulted in a minimum of 26.8% of votes at each election consistently for the same two parties' choice for candidate, and the next highest-placed share having fluctuated between 3% and 23% of the vote.  In those recent elections, save for 2015 when UKIP surged nationally, the third-placed candidate has been a Liberal Democrat, whose candidate lost their deposit in the result perhaps uniquely for an English university city seat in 2017, but which takes in far fewer of the university areas than Southampton Test.  The seat attracted nine candidates in 1997; three in 1992.  Oldest elections in the seat were sometimes a two-candidate contest, as in comparator mid-twentieth century English elections.

History
The constituency was created in 1950, when the two-member Southampton constituency was abolished.

The constituency is named after the River Itchen, which flows through it and is the lesser of the two major rivers that reach the tidal estuary of Southampton Water at the city. Although until the 1970s it was a safe Labour seat, it elected a Conservative MP, Christopher Chope in 1983 and 1987 after the sitting MP Bob Mitchell left Labour in 1981 for the SDP. The combination of Mitchell as a strong SDP-Liberal Alliance candidate in both 1983 and 1987, together with Conservative landslides, made Southampton Itchen highly competitive.

Labour candidate John Denham, defeated Chope by 551 votes in 1992 and held the seat with low-to-average majorities until 2010 when he won by 192 votes. From 2010 to 2017, the three general election results in the seat presented themselves as two-party ultra-marginal (finely-balanced) contests.

Royston Smith gained the seat as a Conservative in 2015. He had led his party's group on the city council and first contested the seat in 2010. He retained the seat in the 2019 general election with a majority of over 4000 votes.

Boundaries

1950–1955: The County Borough of Southampton wards of Bevois, Bitterne and Peartree, Bitterne and Sholing, Newtown, Northam, Portswood, St Denys, St Mary's, Trinity, and Woolston.

1955–1983: The County Borough of Southampton wards of Bitterne, Harefield, Peartree and Bitterne Manor, St Denys and Bitterne Park, St Luke's, St Mary's, Sholing, Swaythling, and Woolston.

1983–1997: The City of Southampton wards of Bargate, Bitterne, Bitterne Park, Harefield, Peartree, St Luke's, and Sholing.

1997–present: The City of Southampton wards of Bargate, Bitterne, Bitterne Park, Harefield, Peartree, Sholing, and Woolston.

The seat covers the eastern part of the City of Southampton, in southern England, specifically the city centre, the eastern port areas (the Port of Southampton is one of the principal ports of the UK), the exclusive Ocean Village quarter, the inner city council estates and the economically deprived Thornhill estate on its eastern boundary. It is seen as the more working class of the two constituencies in the city. The other is Southampton Test – named after the River Test.

The constituency is bounded to the west by Southampton Test (Labour), to the north and east by Eastleigh (Conservative) and in the far north by Romsey and Southampton North (Conservative).

Constituency profile
Workless claimants, registered jobseekers, were in November 2012 close to but slightly below than the national average of 3.8%, at 3.5% of the population based on a statistical compilation by The Guardian, above the average for the South East seats of 2.5% but below, for example, five seats in East Kent.

Members of Parliament

Elections

Elections in the 2010s

Elections in the 2000s

Electorate: 76,603

Elections in the 1990s

Electorate: 76,869

Elections in the 1980s

Elections in the 1970s

Elections in the 1960s

Elections in the 1950s

See also
 List of parliamentary constituencies in Hampshire

Notes

References

Parliamentary constituencies in Hampshire
Constituencies of the Parliament of the United Kingdom established in 1950
Politics of Southampton